The Diocese and Prince-bishopric of Schwerin was a Catholic diocese in Schwerin, Mecklenburg, in Germany. The first registered bishop was ordained in the diocese in 1053, and the diocese ceased to exist in 1994.

Pre-Reformation Catholic (prince-)bishopric 
The bishops of the Roman Catholic diocese of Schwerin, a suffragan of the Metropolitan Archdiocese of Bremen, were simultaneously secular (political) rulers of princely rank (prince-bishop) in the Prince-Bishopric of Schwerin; established 1180 and secularised in 1648), an imperially immediate state of the Holy Roman Empire. Schwerin was the seat of the chapter, Schwerin Cathedral and residence of the bishops until 1239. In 1180 a prince-episcopal residence was established in Bützow, which became the main residence in 1239.

Titulature of the Schwerin bishops 
Not all incumbents of the Schwerin see were imperially invested with princely temporal power as Prince-Bishops and not all were papally confirmed as bishops. In 1180 part of the Schwerin diocesan territory was disentangled from the Duchy of Saxony and became an own territory of imperial immediacy called Prince-Bishopric of Schwerin, an imperially immediate feudal member state of the Holy Roman Empire like many prince-prelatures.

The prince-bishopric was an elective monarchy, with the ruling prince being the respective bishop usually elected by the Cathedral chapter, and confirmed by the Holy See, or exceptionally only appointed by the Holy See. Papally confirmed bishops were then invested by the emperor with the princely regalia, thus the title prince-bishop. However, sometimes the respective incumbent of the see never gained a papal confirmation, but was still invested the princely regalia. Also the opposite occurred with a papally confirmed bishop, never invested as prince. A number of incumbents, elected by the chapter, neither achieved papal confirmation nor imperial investiture, but as a matter of fact nevertheless de facto held the princely power. From 1532 to 1648 all incumbents were Lutherans.

The respective incumbents of the see bore the following titles:
 Bishop of Mecklenburg until 1162
 Bishop of Schwerin 1162 to 1181
 Prince-Bishop of Schwerin from 1181 to 1516, except o the years of 1474 to 1479 and 1506 to 1508
 Administrator of the Prince-Bishopric of Schwerin 1474 to 1479, 1506 to 1508, and again 1516 to 1648. Either simply de facto replacing the Prince-Bishop or lacking canon-law prerequisites the incumbent of the see would officially only hold the title administrator (but nevertheless colloquially referred to as Prince-Bishop).

Catholic bishops of Mecklenburg and Schwerin (1053–1181)

Catholic Prince-Bishops (1181–1474)

Catholic Administrators and Prince-bishops (1474–1532) 

Due to the Reformation, the Catholic diocese was suppressed in 1555, without formal successor.

Lutheran Schwerin

Lutheran Administrators of the Prince-Bishopric (1532–1648)

Lutheran Regional Bishops of Mecklenburg since 1921 

When the Grand dukes of Mecklenburg-Schwerin and Mecklenburg-Strelitz abdicated, the Lutheran state churches became independent and adapted their new Church Orders, providing for a function called Landesbischof (state bishop). In 1934 the regional churches merged into the Evangelical Lutheran Church of Mecklenburg.

 1921–1933: Gerhard Tolzien (for the Church of Mecklenburg-Strelitz)
 1921–1930: Heinrich Behm (for the Evangelical Lutheran Church of Mecklenburg-Schwerin)
 1930–1934: Heinrich Rendtorff (for Mecklenburg-Schwerin, at last also leading the merged church body of all of Mecklenburg)
 1934–1945: Walter Schultz
 1946–1971: Niklot Beste
 1971–1984: Heinrich Rathke
 1984–1996: Christoph Stier
 1996–2007: Hermann Beste
 2007 to date: Andreas von Maltzahn, since the merger of 2012 for the Evangelical Lutheran Church in Northern Germany

New Catholic hierarchy in Schwerin from the 20th century 

After a century and a half of abandonment, the Catholics on the territory were merely taken care of as missionary, part of the vast Apostolic Vicariate of the Northern Missions of Northern Germany, the first post-Reformatory parish having been established in 1709 (St. Anna, Schwerin).
 
Since 1930, the Catholic parishes in the former diocese of Schwerin (and all of Mecklenburg) were part of the Roman Catholic Diocese of Osnabrück.

However, Mecklenburg Soviet occupation zone, whereas Osnabrück was in the British occupation zone (i.e. in the other half of partitioned Germany, and of the political world during the Cold War), so the Bishop of Osnabrück appointed an episcopal commissary. Since 1959, the Osnabrück diocese posted an auxiliary bishop in Schwerin, responsible for Mecklenburg's Catholic parishes :
 Bernhard Schräder, first 1946 – 1959 episcopal commissary for the episcopal commissariate of Schwerin, then 1959 – 1971 auxiliary bishop of Osnabrück diocese for the episcopal commissariate in Schwerin.
 1971 – 1973 (see below): Heinrich Theissing, coadjutor of Osnabrück diocese for the episcopal commissariate in Schwerin
 
On July 23, 1974, the jurisdiction was restored as pre-diocesan 'permanent' Apostolic Administration of Schwerin, its territory being formally split off from the Diocese of Osnabrück. It got two episcopal incumbents : 
 Heinrich Theissing, Apostolic Administrator (July 23, 1973– retired December 5, 1987) with episcopal rights of a residing bishop for the episcopal office in Schwerin; Titular Bishop of Mina (March 13, 1963 – death November 11, 1988), first as Auxiliary Bishop of the Roman Catholic Diocese of Berlin (March 13, 1963 – February 12, 1970), then as Coadjutor Bishop of Schwerin (February 12, 1970 – July 23, 1973), finally an emeritate
 Theodor Hubrich, Apostolic Administrator (1987.11.23 – death 1992.03.26) with episcopal rights of a residing bishop for the episcopal office in Schwerin; previously Titular Bishop of Auca (1975.12.05 – 1987.11.23) as Auxiliary Bishop of Magdeburg (Germany) (1975.12.05 – 1987.11.23).

The diocese was suppressed on October 10, 1994, its territory reassigned to the already established Metropolitan Roman Catholic Archdiocese of Hamburg, thus the Catholic parishes of Mecklenburg became part of the new Roman Catholic Archdiocese of Hamburg.
 1992–1994 Norbert Werbs, diocesan administrator for the episcopal office in Schwerin
 Since 1994 : Norbert Werbs, auxiliary bishop of the Archdiocese of Hamburg for the archiepiscopal office in Schwerin, also episcopal vicar for Mecklenburg

See also 
 List of Catholic dioceses in Germany

Notes

Sources and external links 
 Josef Traeger, Die Bischöfe des mittelalterlichen Bistums Schwerin, Leipzig: St.-Benno-Verlag, 1984. 
 GCatholic - Diocese and Apostolic administration

 List
Lists of office-holders in Germany
Lists of bishops and archbishops in Europe